

The Loring R-III or R-3 was a 1920s Spanish two-seat sesquiplane reconnaissance and light attack aircraft designed by engineer Eduardo Barrón and built by Dr. Jorge Loring's company — Talleres Loring.

Operational history
In the mid 1920s, during General Primo de Rivera's dictatorship the R-III entered a contest along with the Potez 25 for the modernization of the Spanish Military Air Arm. Both planes had similar characteristics, but the Military Directory favoured the Loring R-III in order to promote local industries.
The Aeronáutica Militar placed an order of 110 units, which put the Loring company at the head of the Spanish aeronautical industry of the time.

In October and November 1926 three variants of the R-3 were exhibited at the Loring section of the National Aeronautics Exhibition held in Madrid's Palacio de Cristal: The R-3, the C-1 fighter and the T-1 light trainer. Neither the fighter nor the trainer variants, however, went into production.

Some R-3s remained in service well after the proclamation of the Spanish Republic until the outbreak of the Spanish Civil War. It is not clear, however, whether they saw active service in the civil war.

Variants

R-3The main version with two tandem open cockpits; powered by a  Hispano-Suiza 12Hb engine.

C-1Fighter prototype based on the R-3; one built and exhibited at the Palacio de Cristal Aeronautical exhibition in 1926.

T-1Light trainer based on the R-3; one prototype built in 1926.

Operators
 (Kingdom)
Aeronáutica Militar
 (Republic)
Aeronáutica Militar

Specifications

See also

References

Further reading
 

1920s Spanish military reconnaissance aircraft
Loring aircraft
Sesquiplanes
Spanish attack aircraft
Single-engined tractor aircraft
Aircraft first flown in 1926